Back Stabbers is a studio album by Philadelphia soul group The O'Jays, released in August 1972 on Philadelphia International Records and the iTunes version was released and reissued under Epic Records via Legacy Recordings. Recording sessions for the album took place at Sigma Sound Studios in Philadelphia, Pennsylvania in 1972.

Reception
Back Stabbers was a breakthrough album for the group, reaching the top 10 of the Billboard Pop Albums chart and selling over 500,000 copies within a year of release. It also featured two of their most successful singles, "Back Stabbers" and "Love Train", which hit #1 on the Billboard Pop Singles chart. On September 1, 1972, the title track was certified as a gold single by the Recording Industry Association of America.

The following year, on May 8, Back Stabbers was also certified Gold by the RIAA. It has gained the reputation as a landmark album of early 1970s soul and has been cited by critics as "the pinnacle of Philly soul." In 2012, the album was ranked #318 on Rolling Stone magazine's list of the 500 greatest albums of all time.

It was voted #754 in the third edition of Colin Larkin's All Time Top 1000 Albums (2000).

Trivia
The song Back Stabbers was featured on the Looking for Mr. Goodbar (film) soundtrack

The song Back Stabbers was featured on the Carlito's Way soundtrack, which was found and collected as evidence from O. J. Simpson's white Ford Bronco.

Track listing

Personnel
The O’Jays
 Eddie Levert
 Walter Williams
 William Powell
Musicians

 Dennis Harris – guitar
 Bobby Eli – guitar
 Roland Chambers – guitar
 Bunny Sigler – guitar, piano, producer
 Norman Harris – arranger, guitar
 Ronnie Baker – bass guitar
 Lenny Pakula – organ
 Leon Huff – producer, piano
 Earl Young – drums
 Don Renaldo – conductor, horns, strings
 Thom Bell – arranger, strings, producer
 Larry Washington – bongos, congas, percussion
 Vincent Montana Jr. – percussion, vibraphone

Production and design

 Kenneth Gamble – producer
 Tony Martell – executive producer
 Adam Block – director
 Joe Tarsia – engineer
 Leo Sacks – reissue producer
 Tony Sellari – art direction
 Bobby Martin – arranger
 Thom Bell - arranger

Charts

Weekly charts

Singles

References

External links
 The O'Jays Profile at About.com
 Acclaimed Music profile – Back Stabbers: Ratings, Best of All-time Lists, Best of Decade Lists, etc.
 The O'Jays "Back Stabbers" on Soul Train at YouTube

1972 albums
The O'Jays albums
Albums produced by Kenneth Gamble
Albums produced by Leon Huff
Albums arranged by Bobby Martin
Albums recorded at Sigma Sound Studios
Philadelphia International Records albums